Aleksander Yurievich Drozdenko (1 November 1964) is a Russian economist and politician. He has been Governor of Leningrad Oblast since 28 May 2012.

He graduated from the Leningrad Agricultural Institute with a degree in economics and organization of agriculture in 1986 and obtained a PhD in economics in 2007.

From 1988 to 2002, he worked in various positions in Kingiseppsky District of Leningrad Region and was chairman of the Kingisepp City Council of People's Deputies and mayor of Kingisepp District.

On 6 November 2002, he was appointed as Vice Governor of Leningrad Region and chairman of the Leningrad Region Committee on State Property Management. At the same time, he was a head of the Leningrad regional office of the Ministry of Property Relations of Russia.

On 5 May 2012, the President of Russian Federation introduced Alexander Drozdenko for consideration by the Legislative Assembly of Leningrad Oblast as a nominee for the position of Governor. On 12 May 2012, Drozdenko's appointment as Governor was confirmed. He was inaugurated on 28 May 2012.

At the early election on 13 September 2015, Drozdenko received the support of 471,145 voters (82.1%).

As governor, he initiated a long-term "Region of Successful People" strategy of regional development. He pursues a coherent policy of reducing debt load on the regional budget (the region has not had any debts to commercial structures since 2017), introducing project management and attracting investors. Since 2014, Leningrad Region has been consistently included in the top ten constituent entities of the Russian Federation by volume of investment growth in fixed capital. In 2017, the gross regional product of the region exceeded 1 trillion rubles for the first time. Based on the results for 2017, Leningrad Region took 12th place in the National Rating for Investment Attractiveness established by the Agency for Strategic Initiatives.

Drozdenko initiated a large-scale restoration program in Vyborg involving international and federal funding. He reformed the social security system, basing it on criteria of need and unified social standards. By order of the governor, a program for the renovation of educational establishments was implemented in 2015. In three years (2015–2017), 28 schools and four vocational schools were renovated from regional public funds.

He supported the initiative group to shut down the Krasny Bor hazardous waste landfill site operated by Saint Petersburg within the region's territory.

In 2015, he brought the allocation of municipal plots for housing construction in areas bordering Saint Petersburg under regional control. For compensatory accelerated development of infrastructure in new-build areas, the "Public Amenities in Exchange for Taxes" program was implemented.

Drozdenko meets residents in districts of the region and answers calls on a live phone-in show twice a month. On the initiative of the governor, sessions of the Government of Leningrad Region are broadcast live online. Since 2017, he has had his own blog on Youtube.

Drozdenko is married and has two daughters. His hobbies include hunting, fishing and motorbike touring. He also plays volleyball within a regional government team.

References

1964 births
Living people
United Russia politicians
Russian economists
Russian people of Kazakhstani descent
People from Jambyl Region
Recipients of the Order "For Merit to the Fatherland", 4th class
Recipients of the Order of Honour (Russia)
Recipients of the Medal of the Order "For Merit to the Fatherland" II class
Governors of Leningrad Oblast
Acting heads of the federal subjects of Russia